Rotem Hatuel (born 12 April 1998) is an Israeli football player who plays for Hapoel Be'er Sheva.

Early life
Hatuel was born and raised in Hatzor HaGlilit, Israel, to an Israeli family of Jewish descent.

International career
Hatuel made his debut for the Israel national football team on 27 September 2022 in a friendly game against Malta.

See also 
 List of Jewish footballers
 List of Jews in sports
 List of Israelis

References

External links
 
 

1998 births
Living people
Israeli footballers
Israeli Jews
Footballers from Hatzor HaGlilit
Israel youth international footballers
Israel international footballers
Association football forwards
Hapoel Ironi Kiryat Shmona F.C. players
Hapoel Acre F.C. players
Hapoel Nir Ramat HaSharon F.C. players
Hapoel Umm al-Fahm F.C. players
Maccabi Ahi Nazareth F.C. players
Hapoel Be'er Sheva F.C. players
Israeli Premier League players
Liga Leumit players